Karampon Shanmuganatha Maha Vidyalayam is a provincial school in Karampon, Sri Lanka.

History
The school was established by Sri Mahadeva Swamigal for Saiva children in Karampon.

See also
 List of schools in Northern Province, Sri Lanka

References

External links

Provincial schools in Sri Lanka
Schools in Jaffna District